Celestine is a fictional character from in the Image Comics comic book universe created by Alan Moore, Rob Liefeld and Brian Denham. She was described as an avenging angel, responsible for the destruction of the Tower of Babel, Sodom and Gomorrah and other Old Testament atrocities.  She is described as immensely enjoying her work.

She first appeared in comics hunting the demon character known as the Violator.

First Rebellion Against God
During the initial rebellion against Heaven, Celestine slaughtered the rebels and wore their teeth as a necklace. This earned her the respect, and fear, of her fellow angels.

Celestine had destroyed countless civilizations, including Sodom, Gomorrah, and the Tower of Babel. When the locusts ravaged Egypt, Celestine was in the center of it and she began to enjoy killing more than actually serving God.

Violator vs. Badrock

Upon hearing that humans were researching inter-dimensional travel, particularly to Hell, Celestine was sent to New York City to put an end to their efforts. Upon learning that Dr. Sally McAllister had completed her research to open the Hellgate, she attacked the Whiteside Parsons Institute.

She believed she had found the Violator who was being used to power the device, but was tricked by the demon. The Violator turned into his Clown form and pointed at Badrock claiming he was the demon. While her back was turned, she had her heart ripped out by the Violator. In her final dying moments, she activated McAllister's machine to transport the entire facility and all those inside back to Hell.

He body continued to provide energy for several hours. However, once it turned to ashes, the machine stopped and returned to Washington, D.C.

Celestine Mini-Series

A worker at the Whiteside-Parson Institute, Joseph Yallod, retrieved the dust and remains of Celestine from her sacrifice to bring the institute to Hell. He wanted to bring Celestine back to life so that he may marry her and bear children with her. He places several spells around his facility so that no creature from Hell may stop his plan.

Meanwhile, Celestine met one of Hell's demons in her afterlife. She learned that Angels who killed, are considered murders and do not receive the grace of God in Heaven, but instead are sent to Hell. She begins her spite against Heaven for this action as she feels she deserves a spot in Heaven.

Yallod was tracked by Naamah, a disciple of one of Hell's devils, and several Angels. They worked together to break through is protection spells and kill Yallod before completing the opening to Hell to revive Celestine, leaving her trapped in Hell.

Rage of Angels

On Elysium, two of Celestine's followers, Astra and Crystal, devise a plot to resurrect Celestine. They recognize the risk that she may return partly damaged or brain dead as a result of the experiment. They successfully resurrect Celestine who then convinces a host of Angels to 'flip sides' and fight against Heaven. She now recognizes with scorn that Heaven does not take care of its own and the rebels from the first war against Heaven were correct. She convinces them to head to the Isle of Paradise where there are powers not beholden to God.

Upon arriving, she frees the Amazonians from a prison and enlists their aid in fighting a war against their oppressors. Lady Demeter watches from the bushes and realizes Celestine was using mind powers to cloud their thoughts.

After Angela was summoned by Metatron and Glory was summoned by Lady Demeter to aid freeing the people, Celestine escaped to an Orbital Angel Station. She reveals to the workers her real plan was gaining access to the Elemental Fire aboard the station. The Amazonians celebrated in a false victory.

The U.S. Government dispatches Youngblood and Team Youngblood to investigate the station, but find Celestine has already fled to the Middle East where Angela heads to cut her off.

In the Middle East, Glory and Angela battled Celestine along with her cronies Astra and Crystal. They are soon outnumbered as Celestine used the Elemental Fire to raise the dead to fight for her. As the dead were slowly beaten back by Angela and Glory, Celestine threw a fit. Glory pointed out that something is amiss as an angel would not summon the dead nor throw a fit. Angela and Glory were shortly thereafter saved as all the corpses ceased to move as Maximage cut off the Elemental Fire power source to Celestine.

As Celestine began to gain the upperhand with knocking out Angela and gaining an upper hand on Glory, Maximage pushed herself to use her powers. An energy bolt revealed that Celestine was being controlled by Malebolgia as he transports back to Hell with Celestine's soul.

Angela and Celestine agreed to travel to Hell to retrieve Celestine's soul from Malebolgia. They were initially toyed with as Malebolgia revealed he was all powerful and would soon overthrow his boss. However, Lucifer overheard suddenly appeared and vanquished Malebolgia as punishment. Lucifer then informed Angela that Elysium was actually one of the 10 levels of Hell. Angela became speechless for the first time in ages. Having freed Celestine, Angela returned to her free-lance hunting duties and Celestine was released for her own journey.

References

Extreme Studios titles
Image Comics female supervillains
Arcade Comics characters
Fictional angels
Fictional women soldiers and warriors
Comics characters introduced in 1993
Image Comics characters with superhuman strength
Mythology in comics
Spawn characters